Marsupidium epiphytum is a liverwort species in the genus Marsupidium from the New Zealand.

Prenylated bibenzyls can be isolated from M. epiphytum.

References 

Jungermanniales